The 1951 Gent–Wevelgem was the 13th edition of the Gent–Wevelgem cycle race and was held on 25 March 1951. The race started in Ghent and finished in Wevelgem. The race was won by André Rosseel.

General classification

References

Gent–Wevelgem
1951 in road cycling
1951 in Belgian sport
March 1951 sports events in Europe